Coevorden is a railway station located in Coevorden, Netherlands. The station was opened on 1 July 1905 and is located on the Zwolle–Emmen railway. The station is operated by Arriva. Coevorden is also the end of a freight railway from Bad Bentheim.

Train services

Bus services

External links
NS website 
Dutch Public Transport journey planner

See also
 List of railway stations in Drenthe

Coevorden
Railway stations in Drenthe
Railway stations opened in 1905
Railway stations on the Emmerlijn
1905 establishments in the Netherlands
Railway stations in the Netherlands opened in the 20th century